Pierre Mellina (born 25 February 1957)  is a Luxembourgish politician and retired track and field athlete.

Political office

He is currently the Mayor of Pétange, a commune in the far south-west of the country, standing for the Christian Social People's Party (CSV).  He was previously a member of the communal council (1994 – 99) and an échevin (2000 – 04) in Pétange.

Sporting achievements

In the early 1980s, Mellina was one of Luxembourg's foremost long-distance runners, winning the Luxembourgian national championships in the 5,000 (1981, 1982) and the 10,000 metres (1982). He won the Eurocross cross country competition in Diekirch in 1981.

References

1957 births
Living people
Mayors of Pétange
Christian Social People's Party politicians
Luxembourgian male long-distance runners
Luxembourgian sportsperson-politicians